Fare zone 2 is an inner zone of Transport for London's zonal fare system used for calculating the price of tickets for travel on the London Underground, London Overground, Docklands Light Railway and, since 2007, on National Rail services.

Background
London is split into six approximately concentric zones for the purpose of determining the cost of single fares and Travelcards. Every London Underground line—except for the Waterloo & City line—has stations in zone 2.

List of stations

The following stations are in zone 2:

Changes
January 1999: East India and Pudding Mill Lane (DLR) from Zone 3 to Zone 2/3 boundary
January 2008: Hampstead Heath from Zone 3 to Zone 2, Willesden Junction from Zone 3 to Zone 2/3 boundary and Acton Central from Zone 2 to Zone 3
January 2016: Stratford, Stratford High Street, Stratford International DLR station, West Ham, Canning Town, Star Lane and Abbey Road from Zone 3 to Zone 2/3 boundary.
May 2021: Kennington from Zone 2 to Zone 1/2 boundary

See also

References